The Leipzig–Jakarta list of 100 words is used by linguists to test the degree of chronological separation of languages by comparing words that are resistant to borrowing. The Leipzig–Jakarta list became available in 2009.

In the 1950s, the linguist Morris Swadesh published a list of 200 words called the Swadesh list, allegedly the 200 lexical concepts found in all languages that were least likely to be borrowed from other languages. Swadesh later whittled his list down to 100 items. The Swadesh list, however, was based mainly on intuition, according to Martin Haspelmath and Uri Tadmor.

The Loanword Typology Project, with the World Loanword Database (WOLD), published by the Max Planck Digital Library, was established to rectify this problem. Experts on 41 languages from across the world were given a uniform vocabulary list and asked to provide the words for each item in the language on which they were an expert, as well as information on how strong the evidence that each word was borrowed was. The 100 concepts that were found in most languages and were most resistant to borrowing formed the Leipzig–Jakarta list. Only 62 items on the Leipzig–Jakarta list and on the 100-word Swadesh list overlap, hence a 38% difference between the two lists.

25% of the words in the Leipzig–Jakarta list are body parts: mouth, eye, leg/foot, navel, liver, knee, etc. Six animal words appear on the list: fish, bird, dog, louse, ant and fly – animals found everywhere humans can be found.

The items house, name, rope and to tie are products of human culture, but are probably found in all present-day human societies. Haspelmath and Tadmor drew the conclusion that "rope is the most basic of human tools and tying is the most basic technology".

List
Lexical items in the Leipzig–Jakarta list are ranked by semantic stability, i.e. words least likely to be replaced by other words as a language evolves. The right two columns indicate inclusion on the 100-word and 207-word Swadesh lists.

Other differences with the Swadesh list
Items on the 100-word Swadesh list but not on the Leipzig–Jakarta list:

all
bark
belly
cloud
cold
die
dry
feather
fingernail
fly (verb)
full
grease
green
head
heart
hot
kill
lie
man
many
moon
mountain
path
person
round
seed
sit
sleep
sun
swim
that
tree
two
walk
we
white
woman
yellow

See also
 ASJP list
 Swadesh list
 Dolgopolsky list
 Comparative method

References

 Loanwords in the World's Languages: A Comparative Handbook, Martin Haspelmath and Uri Tadmor (editors), 2009, de Gruyter Publishing

External links
The Leipzig-Jakarta list on Concepticon

Linguistics lists
Word lists